Louanne Mermier (born 1 February 2001) is a French ice hockey player for Megève HC and the French national team.

She represented France at the 2019 IIHF Women's World Championship.

References

External links

2001 births
Living people
French women's ice hockey defencemen